Stoyan Ivanov Yordanov (born 29 January 1944, in Sofia) is a former Bulgarian footballer who played as a goalkeeper.

At international level, Yordanov represented the Bulgarian national team on 25 occasions between 1968 and 1975, and participated at the 1970 FIFA World Cup and the 1968 Olympics, where he won a silver medal. After his retirement, he worked in a coaching capacity with CSKA Sofia and also managed the Bulgaria U21 team.

Honours

Club
CSKA Sofia
Bulgarian League (7): 1965–66, 1968–69, 1970–71, 1971–72, 1972–73, 1974–75, 1975–76
Bulgarian Cup (5): 1965, 1969, 1972, 1973, 1974

References

External links
 

1944 births
Living people
Bulgarian footballers
Association football goalkeepers
Bulgaria international footballers
PFC CSKA Sofia players
OFC Sliven 2000 players
PFC Cherno More Varna players
First Professional Football League (Bulgaria) players
Olympic footballers of Bulgaria
Footballers at the 1968 Summer Olympics
1970 FIFA World Cup players
Bulgarian football managers
Olympic silver medalists for Bulgaria
Olympic medalists in football
Footballers from Sofia
Medalists at the 1968 Summer Olympics